Moussier Tombola is a French comedian of Senegalese origins. He also does stand-up in various shows. He named himself Moussier Tombola, exactly as his father would pronounce the word "Monsieur" (Mr. in French). 
He was born in Saint-Dié-des-Vosges on 21 February 1987.

In 2011, he released his debut single "Logobitombo (Corde à sauter)" reaching #5 in the official French Singles Chart. The song is based on infectious dance moves that became a craze and went viral on YouTube, and eventually a big hit, "Logobitombo" being a created word combining the African music genre and dance Logobi combined with Tombo (part of his name), literally Tombola-style Logobi music.

The music video in cooperation with his friend Jessy Matador directed by Hilton Aya also refers to the success via YouTube.

Discography

Album
Le Dernier De La Classe Classe

Singles

References

External links

Moussier Tombola Official website
Moussier Tombola Facebook
Moussier Tombola on Skyrock website

Senegalese comedians
French comedians
Living people
Year of birth missing (living people)